William Law Anderson (21 October 1879 – 25 October 1910) was a Scottish immigrant to the United States who became the first golfer to win four U.S. Opens, with victories in 1901, 1903, 1904, and 1905. He is still the only man to win three consecutive titles, and only Bobby Jones, Ben Hogan, and Jack Nicklaus have equalled his total of four championships. He is a member of the World Golf Hall of Fame.

Early life
Born in North Berwick, in East Lothian, Scotland, Anderson was educated at the public school in North Berwick and was a licensed caddie on the West Links at the age of 11. Upon leaving school, he apprenticed as a club maker under Alex Aitken in Gullane.

At age 18, Anderson emigrated from Scotland to the United States in March 1896—sailing aboard the S.S. Poseidon from Glasgow—along with his father, Thomas Anderson, and his brother Tom, landing at Ellis Island. He played in the U.S. Open the following year, finishing in second place by one stroke, after Joe Lloyd eagled the final hole.

Golf career
His first significant win came in 1899 at the Southern California Open, before he started his run at the U.S. Open. In the 14 straight Opens that he played, Anderson won four, was second once, third once, fourth twice, fifth three times, 11th twice and 15th once. He won titles with both the old gutta-percha golf ball, and the rubber-cored ball which came into use in 1902. Anderson also won the Western Open in 1902, 1904, 1908, and 1909; this tournament, the second-oldest in the U.S., was classified as a PGA Tour event for most of its more than 100 years of operation, and is classified by some golf historians as a major championship during Anderson's era.

Anderson's accuracy with all clubs, combined with his concentration under pressure, made him a formidable and highly respected competitor. Anderson made his living as a golf professional, working at ten different clubs in fourteen years. He listed the Apawamis Club in Rye, New York as his home course from 1901 through 1906. He played many exhibition challenge matches for stakes, in addition to tournaments.

Death and legacy
Anderson died at age 31, officially from epilepsy in Chestnut Hill, Philadelphia, Pennsylvania. He had played competitive matches in Pennsylvania right up to a few days before his death. However, golf historian Robert Sommers wrote in 1995 that Anderson 'drank himself to death'. Anderson is buried in Ivy Hill Cemetery in Philadelphia.

Anderson was an original member of the PGA Hall of Fame, and was inducted into the World Golf Hall of Fame in 1975.

Major championships

Wins (4)

1 Defeated Alex Smith in an 18-hole playoff: Anderson (85), Smith (86) 
2 Defeated David Brown in an 18-hole playoff: Anderson (82), Brown (84)

Results timeline
Among the majors, Anderson played in only the U.S. Open.

"T" indicates a tie for a place
Green background for wins. Yellow background for top-10.

Other victories
(Note: this list may be incomplete)
1899 Southern California Open
1902 Western Open
1904 Western Open
1908 Western Open
1909 Western Open

See also
Golf in Scotland
List of men's major championships winning golfers

References

External links

Willie Anderson – The Forgotten Superstar of Golf
Famous North Berwick Golfers – William Law Anderson

Scottish male golfers
American male golfers
Winners of men's major golf championships
World Golf Hall of Fame inductees
Scottish emigrants to the United States
Golfers from North Berwick
Golfers from Philadelphia
Neurological disease deaths in Pennsylvania
Deaths from epilepsy
Burials at Ivy Hill Cemetery (Philadelphia)
1879 births
1910 deaths